Mottu is a 1985 Indian Malayalam film, directed by Joy. The film stars Vijayaraghavan in the lead role.

Cast
Vijayaraghavan as Firoz
Idavela Babu as Saju
Manoj
Priyatha

References

External links
 

1985 films
1980s Malayalam-language films